Aaron Burns (born January 28, 1985 in Houston, Texas) is an American film producer, actor, film director, screenwriter, film editor, and cinematographer. Burns is a frequent collaborator with horror director Eli Roth.

Filmography

References

External links

 

Living people
Film producers from Texas
American male film actors
Male actors from Austin, Texas
1985 births
21st-century American male actors
American cinematographers